Chlorhoda metaleuca is a moth of the subfamily Arctiinae first described by William Schaus in 1912. It is found in Costa Rica.

References

Arctiini